Mount Bertha is a 10,204-foot (3,110 meter) glaciated mountain summit located in the Fairweather Range of the Saint Elias Mountains, in southeast Alaska, United States.

Geography and naming
The mountain's name first appeared in 1910 when published by U.S. Coast and Geodetic Survey. The USGS claims it was named after S.S. Bertha, an Alaska Commercial Company steamer in service from 1888 until it wrecked at Uyak Bay on July 18, 1915. However, according to Bradford Washburn of the Boston Museum of Science and American Mountaineering Museum, this feature was named for a prostitute in Skagway known by members of the International Boundary Commission who surveyed the area.

Climbing history
The first ascent of the peak was made July 30, 1940, by Bradford Washburn, his wife Barbara Washburn, Maynard Miller, Michl Feuersinger, and Thomas Winship. It was the first mountain climbing experience for Barbara, and Bradford would later refer to the expedition as their honeymoon since they had recently married in April. After the expedition she would learn that she was several months pregnant. In 1947 she became the first woman to summit Denali. The months May through June offer the most favorable weather for climbing and viewing.

Climate

Based on the Köppen climate classification, Mount Bertha has a subarctic climate with cold, snowy winters, and mild summers. Weather systems coming off the Gulf of Alaska are forced upwards by the Fairweather Range (orographic lift), causing heavy precipitation in the form of rainfall and snowfall. Temperatures can drop below −20 °C with wind chill factors below −30 °C. This climate supports hanging glaciers on its slopes as well as the immense Brady Glacier to the south, Reid Glacier to the northeast, and Johns Hopkins Glacier to the northwest. Precipitation runoff and meltwater from its glaciers drains into Glacier Bay and the Gulf of Alaska.

See also

Geography of Alaska
Geology of Alaska

Gallery

References

External links

 Weather forecast: Mount Bertha
 Account of first ascent: American Alpine Club
 Photo of SS Bertha shipwreck: Alaska State Library-Historical Collections
 Fairweather Range webcam: National Park Service (Mt. Bertha centered in the distance - on a rare clear day)

Bertha
Bertha
Bertha
Bertha
Bertha